Sir Herbert William Wrangham Wilberforce (8 February 1864 – 28 March 1941) was a British male tennis player. He was vice-president of the All England Lawn Tennis and Croquet Club from 1911 to 1921 and served as its president from 1921 to 1936. In 1887, he and Patrick Bowes-Lyon won the doubles in Wimbledon. 

In 1888 they were unable to defend their title when they were beaten in the Challenge Round by Ernest and William Renshaw. His best singles performance at Wimbledon came in 1886 when he reached the semifinal of the All Comers tournament in which he lost in five sets to compatriot Ernest Lewis. He also reached the quarter-finals of the singles in 1882, 1883 and 1888.

Herbert was a brother of physicist Lionel, son of judge Edward, grandson of archdeacon Robert and great-grandson of abolitionist William Wilberforce.

He later served as president and chairman of the All England Lawn Tennis Club. He was made a Knight Bachelor in the 1931 New Year Honours.

Grand Slam finals

Doubles (1 title, 1 runner-up)

Barrister and magistrate
Having studied law at the University of London, he was called to the bar at the Inner Temple in 1888, and practised on the North Eastern Circuit. He was appointed a stipendiary magistrate in Bradford, Yorkshire. In 1914 he was appointed to the Metropolitan Bench of Magistrates and in 1926 became Deputy Chairman of the County of London Quarter Sessions. He retired in 1938.

Politics
A member of the Liberal Party, Wilberforce unsuccessfully contested Hackney North at the 1900 General Election. In 1901 he was elected to the London County Council as a Progressive Party councillor representing St Pancras North. He served a single three-year term on the county council.

References

1864 births
1941 deaths
19th-century British people
19th-century male tennis players
British male tennis players
Sportspeople from Kensington
Wimbledon champions (pre-Open Era)
Grand Slam (tennis) champions in men's doubles
Herbert
Knights Bachelor
Members of London County Council
Members of the Inner Temple
Tennis players from Munich
British sportsperson-politicians